Alford Corriette (born 23 August 1948 in Montserrat) was a West Indies cricketer who played 24 matches for the Combined Islands and the Leeward Islands in a career that lasted from 1972 until 1976.  A right-handed batsman and right-arm medium pace bowler, Corriette scored 851 runs and claimed 44 wickets in his first-class career, including 81 against the touring Australian cricket team in 1973.

References

1948 births
Living people
Combined Islands cricketers
Leeward Islands cricketers
Montserratian cricketers